Macaroni Factory of the Sibirsky Mukomol Partnership is a building in Zheleznodorozhny City District of Novosibirsk, Russia. It is located at Fabrichnaya Street. The factory was constructed in 1910.

History
The factory was built in 1910 by Sibirsky Mukomol Partnership. Soon, the production of the factory was awarded at the exhibitions in Paris, Rome and the Baltic Exhibition of the Society of Agriculture.

The building is now occupied by Novosibirsk Macaroni Factory.

References

Zheleznodorozhny City District, Novosibirsk
Manufacturing companies based in Novosibirsk
Buildings and structures in Novosibirsk
Industrial buildings completed in 1910
Cultural heritage monuments of regional significance in Novosibirsk Oblast